The European and African Zone was one of the three zones of regional Davis Cup competition in 2010.

In the European and African Zone there are four different groups in which teams compete against each other to advance to the next group.

Participating teams

Seeds

Remaining Nations

Draw

 and  promoted to Group I in 2011.

First Round Matches

Great Britain vs. Lithuania

Ireland vs. Turkey

Monaco vs. Bulgaria

Slovenia vs. Norway

Denmark vs. Portugal

Egypt vs. Cyprus

Estonia vs. Hungary

Bosnia and Herzegovina vs. Macedonia

Second Round Matches

Ireland vs. Lithuania

Slovenia vs. Bulgaria

Portugal vs. Cyprus

Estonia vs. Bosnia and Herzegovina

Play-offs Matches

Great Britain vs. Turkey

Monaco vs. Norway

Egypt vs. Denmark

Hungary vs. Macedonia

Third round Matches

Lithuania vs. Slovenia

Portugal vs. Bosnia and Herzegovina

References

External links
Seeds announced for 2010 Draw

Europe Africa Zone Group II
Davis Cup Europe/Africa Zone